Norway was represented by Kirsti Sparboe, with the song "Karusell", at the 1965 Eurovision Song Contest, which took place on 20 March in Naples, Italy. "Karusell" was chosen as the Norwegian entry at the Melodi Grand Prix on 13 February. This was the first of Sparboe's three Eurovision appearances for Norway.

Before Eurovision

Melodi Grand Prix 1965
The MGP was held at the studios of the Norwegian Broadcasting Corporation in Oslo, hosted by Odd Grythe. Five songs took part in the final with each song sung twice by different singers, once with a small combo and once with a full orchestra. However Wenche Myhre, who had been due to perform a version of "Karusell", had to withdraw at the last minute through illness so Sparboe sang both versions of the song. The winning song was chosen by postcard voting.

At Eurovision 
On the night of the final Sparboe performed 7th in the running order, following Austria and preceding Belgium. Each national jury awarded 5-3-1 to their top three songs, and at the close "Karusell" had picked up only 1 point (from Austria), placing Norway joint 13th (with Portugal) of the 18 entries. The Norwegian jury awarded its 5 points to the Netherlands.

Voting

References

External links 
Full national final on nrk.no

1965
Countries in the Eurovision Song Contest 1965
1965
Eurovision
Eurovision